Bellata railway station is located on the Mungindi line in New South Wales, Australia. It serves the village of Bellata, opening on 1 April 1897 as Woolabra when the line was extended from Boggabri to Moree. It was renamed Bellata on 1 March 1909.

Services
Bellata is served by NSW TrainLink's daily Northern Tablelands Xplorer service operating between Moree and Sydney. This station is a request stop, so the train only stops here if passengers have booked to board/alight here.

References

External links
Bellata station details Transport for New South Wales

Easy Access railway stations in New South Wales
North West Slopes
Railway stations in Australia opened in 1897
Regional railway stations in New South Wales